Vespucio Norte is an underground metro station on the Line 2 of the Santiago Metro, in Santiago, Chile. It is the northern terminus of the Line 2 and provides 120 underground parking spaces. The station was opened on 21 December 2006 as part of the extension of the line from Einstein.

The station is located on the south side of the Vespucio Norte Express freeway, within the borders of Recoleta, as well as serving nearby Huechuraba indirectly.

Structure 
The station has two side platforms and two tracks. At the center of the station a large mezzanine, without central support, spans over tracks and platforms, all of which are surmounted by a longitudinally curved ceiling.

A very long pavilion, which features an irregularly sawtooth shaped roof, houses the entrances to the station and is connected to a bus terminal.

References

Santiago Metro stations
Santiago Metro Line 2